John P. Brennan  (October 20, 1864 – October 14, 1943) was a Democratic politician in the U.S. state of Ohio who served as Ohio State Treasurer 1913-1915.

Biography

John P. Brennan was born at Urbana, Champaign County, Ohio in 1864, and attended public and parochial schools in that city. At age 21, he was nominated for recorder of Champaign County by the Democratic Party. He was a member of the Democratic Central Committee for ten years, and chairman of the Champaign Democratic Executive Committee for ten years.

Brennan was a member of the State Democratic Executive Committee for four years, and State Central Committee for the four years. He was a member of Urbana City Council for ten years. He was First Deputy State Fire Marshal for two years, then was appointed Cashier of the State Treasury in 1909 by fellow Democrat State Treasurer David S. Creamer. He won election for Treasurer in 1912, and began his term January, 1913.

Brennan died October 14, 1943 at Columbus. He is buried at Oak Dale Cemetery in Urbana .

References

Ohio Democrats
State treasurers of Ohio
1864 births
1943 deaths
People from Urbana, Ohio